Christmaplax mirabilis is a species of crab native to Christmas Island, Australia. It is the only known species in the genus Christmaplax.

References

Crabs
Fauna of Christmas Island
Monotypic crustacean genera